Karl Krushelnick from the University of Michigan, was awarded the status of Fellow in the American Physical Society, after he was nominated by the university's Division of Plasma Physics in 2007, for pioneering contributions to experimental high-intensity laser plasma physics including the production of high-quality relativistic electron beams, energetic proton beams and the development of techniques to measure very large magnetic fields in intense laser-produced plasmas.

References 

Fellows of the American Physical Society
American Physical Society
American physicists
Living people
Date of death missing
University of Michigan faculty
Year of birth missing (living people)